Mao's Last Dancer may refer to:

 Mao's Last Dancer (book), an autobiography written by Li Cunxin
 Mao's Last Dancer (film), a 2009 film directed by Bruce Beresford